This is a list of years in Chile. See also the timeline of Chilean history.  For only articles about years in Chile that have been written, see :Category:Years in Chile.

Twenty-first century

Twentieth century

Nineteenth century

See also 
 Timeline of Santiago de Chile
 List of years by country

Years in Chile
Years
Chile